Homsar may refer to:
 Homsar, Iran, a village in Isfahan Province, Iran
 A character in Homestar Runner, see List of Homestar Runner characters